Veronica Cornolti (born 30 December 1994) is an Italian former professional racing cyclist, who rode professionally between 2013 and 2015 for the  team. In her final season with the team, she finished ninth at the 2015 Gran Prix San Luis Femenino.

See also
 List of 2015 UCI Women's Teams and riders

References

External links

1994 births
Living people
Italian female cyclists
Place of birth missing (living people)